A list of topics related to the topic of Sufism.



A
 Abdus Salaam ibn Mishish
 Abou Ben Adhem
 Abu Al Fazal Abdul Wahid Yemeni Tamimi
 Abu al-Hasan al-Shadhili
 Abul Hasan Hankari
 Abusaeid Abolkheyr
 Abu Saeed Mubarak Makhzoomi
 Ahl-e Haqq
 Ak Tagh
 Al-Hallaj
 Al-Khidr
 Ali Hajweri
 Ashraf Jahangir Semnani
 Farid al-Din Attar

B
 Badawiyyah
 Bektashi
 Bholoo Shah
 Bulleh Shah
 François Bernier
 Sufi Barkat Ali

C
 Chishti Order

D
 Dervish

E
 Yunus Emre
 Muhammad Emin Er

F
 Fakir
 Fakhruddin 'Iraqi
 Fareeduddin Ganjshakar
 Fariduddin Attar
 Fassiya
 Fourth Way
 Fassi
 Futuwa

G
 Gülen movement

H
 Henry Wilberforce-Clarke
 Eric Hermelin
 Hidayat Inayat Khan
 History of Sufism

I
 Ibn Arabi
 Inayat Khan
 Idries Shah

J
 Jamali (artist)
 Jami
 Junayd of Baghdad, founder of Junaidia order

K
 Kashf
 Kashf ul Mahjoob
 Khalwa
 Khalwati order
 Knowledge by presence

L
 List of famous Sufis
 List of tariqas

M
 Ameer Muhammad Akram Awan
 Madurai Maqbara
 Makrifat
 Marifat
 Maudood Chishti
 Maulana Syed Muhammad Zauqi Shah
 Mohammad Yousaf Abu al-Farah Tartusi
 Moinuddin Chishti

N
 Naqshbandi Sufi Order
 Naqshbandia Owaisiah
 Nimatullahi Sufi order
 Noorbakshi Sufi order
 Nizamuddin Auliya

O
 Ömer Faruk Tekbilek

P
 François Pétis de la Croix

Q 
 Qadiriyya
 Qawwali

R
 Rumi, Jalāl ad-Dīn Muḥammad
 Riaz Ahmed Gohar Shahi

S
 Sachal Sarmast 
 Safaviya
 Salik
 Sema
 Shadhili
 Shah Abdul Latif Bhittai
 Abdul Qadir Jilani
 Shaikh Syed Abdul Razzaq Jilani
 Sufi metaphysics
 Sufi music
 Sufi philosophy
 Sufi poetry
 Sufi studies
 Sufi texts
 Sufi whirling
 Sufism
 Sufism in India
 Sufism in Jordan
 Sultan Bahoo
 Sumer Dargah
 Syed Abdul Rehman Jilani Dehlvi

T
 Tajalli
 Tariqa
 Tazkiah
 Tijaniyyah

U
 Urs   
 Uwais al-Qarni   
 Uwaisi

V
 Vatul

W
 The Whirling Dervishes
 Wali Kirani

Z
 Zahed
 Zahediyeh

Index
Sufism-related topics
Sufism